The AgustaWestland AW139, now known as the Leonardo AW139, is a 15-seat medium-sized twin-engined helicopter developed and produced by the Anglo-Italian helicopter manufacturer AgustaWestland (now part of Leonardo). It is marketed at several different roles, including VIP/corporate transport, military use, offshore transport, fire fighting, law enforcement, search and rescue, emergency medical service, disaster relief, and maritime patrol.

The AW139 was originally designed jointly by the Italian helicopter manufacturer Agusta and the American company Bell Helicopters, thus it was marketed as the Agusta-Bell AB139, but was redesignated as the AW139 after Bell withdrew from the project. In addition to AgustaWestland's manufacturing facilities in Italy and the United States, other companies are also involved in the programme, such as the Polish manufacturer PZL-Świdnik, which has produced hundreds of AW139 airframes, and HeliVert, a joint venture between AgustaWestland and Russian Helicopters, which has also established a production line inside Russia for the type. Having performed its maiden flight on 3 February 2001, the AW139 entered revenue service during 2003 and quickly proved itself to be a commercial success.

Many of the AW139 customers have been in the civilian sector; large fleets have been obtained by operators such as CHC Helicopter, Gulf Helicopters, and Weststar Aviation. Its performance has enabled it to become popular amongst operators supporting the offshore oil and gas industry. A dedicated militarised model, the AW139M, was also developed by AgustaWestland; it was first procured by the Italian Air Force, other military operators include the United States Air Force, which operates the MH-139 Grey Wolf model. The Japanese business Mitsui Bussan Aerospace has obtained an exclusive distribution agreement for the AW139 in the country. Over 1,100 rotorcraft had been sold by January 2021. The AW139 has been subsequently developed into the AW149, an enlarged medium-lift military-orientated rotorcraft.

Development

Origins

In 1997, the Italian helicopter manufacturer Agusta launched a programme to develop a replacement for the Bell Huey family of helicopters (which had been built in very large numbers by Bell Helicopter and under license by Agusta). A potential market of 900 aircraft was predicted. In 1998, Bell and Agusta entered into an agreement setting up a joint venture, Bell/Agusta Aerospace Company (BAAC), to develop two aircraft: a conventional helicopter and a tiltrotor aircraft. These became the Bell/Agusta AB139 and Bell/Agusta BA609 respectively. Bell was to be the leading partner for the development of the BA609 while Agusta would be the lead partner for the AB139; it was intended for production, sales, and support to be shared.

On 26 September 2000, the first order for the type was placed by Bristow Helicopters. The first preproduction helicopter flew on 3 February 2001 at Vergiate in Italy, with two further AW139s also participating in flying trials. The first production AW139 made its first flight on 24 June 2002. European JAA certification was received in June 2003, and its FAA type certificate followed in December 2004. By May 2005, the AW139 had received in excess of 100 orders worldwide. In the US, the type was marketed under the designation US139, and was entered into the US Army's Light Utility Helicopter competition.<ref>"Mission-Configured US139 Demonstrates Ability To Meet And Exceed Requirements."  AgustaWestland, 21 December 2005.</ref> One key market for the AW139 was the oil and gas industry, which required helicopters of increased endurance for offshore operations. In 2005, AgustaWestland bought out Bell's 25% share in the program and all of its rights to the AW139 for $95 million.Bell Helicopter Sells Interest In AB139 Joint Venture". Aero News, 22 November 2005.

In April 2008, AgustaWestland revealed that it was in the process of certifying an increase in the AW139's max gross weight to 14,991 lb (6,800 kg) to better compete in long-range markets served by helicopters such as the larger Sikorsky S-92 and Eurocopter EC225. In 2007, a second production line at the United States AgustaWestland Aerospace plant in Philadelphia, Pennsylvania was established; the Philadelphia plant produced its 200th AW139 in September 2014, at which point U.S. production was intended to reach 40 units per year in the near future. By 2011, AgustaWestland was producing 90 AW139s per year; 9.5% of the company's overall revenue in 2010 was attributed to the type. By 2013, a combined total of 720 AW139s had been sold to over 200 operators in 60 countries.

Further development

In 2011, a military-configured variant, the AW139M, was revealed by AgustaWestland. It was promoted at the US market, including for the U.S. Air Force's Common Vertical Lift Support Program. The AW139M is equipped with a high definition forward-looking infrared (FLIR), self-protection system, heavy-duty landing gear, and has low thermal and acoustic signatures; a significant proportion of the equipment is sourced from American manufacturers. Options offered include an external stores system including various armaments, armoured seats, self-sealing fuel tanks, and a full ice protection system for all-weather operations.

The AW139 serves as the basis for AgustaWestland's wider business strategy, under which it aims to produce a standardised family of helicopters with common design features. The sharing of components and design philosophies is intended to simplify maintenance and training for operators; commonality also lowers the production costs. The AW139 was the first of this group, and as of 2014, it was to be joined by the larger AW149 and AW189, aimed at military and civilian customers respectively. Advances made in the development of new models are intended to be transferable onto existing family members, decreasing the cost of future upgrades for the AW139.Head, Elan. "Upward Trend." Vertical, 22 January 2014.

In June 2010, it was announced that AgustaWestland and Rostvertol would build a manufacturing plant in Tomilino, Moscow Region, where it was initially planned to produce AW139s by 2012. HeliVert, a joint venture between AgustaWestland and Rostvertol, commenced domestic production of the AW139 in 2012, at which point it was planned that between 15 and 20 helicopters would be produced per year. The first AW139 to be assembled in Russia made its first flight in December 2012. In January 2013, the Russian Defense Ministry was reportedly considering placing an order for seven AW139s. In January 2014, HeliVert received a Certificate of Approval from the Aviation Register of the Interstate Aviation Committee to commence production of commercial AW139s. In September 2014, a certificate was granted to perform comprehensive maintenance and servicing of the type at the Tomilino facility.

During 2015, AgustaWestland unveiled an AW139 model with an increased gross weight of seven tonnes, enabling a range of 305 km while carrying 12 passengers; existing AW139s can also be rebuilt to the newer heavy-weight model. This heavier airframe comes at the expense of decreased hot and high performance. In November 2015, AgustaWestland demonstrated a 60-minute "run-dry" test (no oil) of an AW139's main gearbox, 30 minutes greater than any other certified rotorcraft at the time.

Design

The AW139 is a conventional twin-engine multi-role helicopter. It has a five-bladed fully articulated main rotor with a titanium hub and composite blades and a four-bladed articulated tail rotor. It is fitted with retractable tricycle landing gear, the two aft wheels retracting into external sponsons which are also used to house emergency equipment. It is flown by a crew of two pilots, with up to 15 passengers accommodated in three rows of five. The AW139 had been aimed at a vacant niche in the market, sitting below larger types such as the Eurocopter AS332 Super Puma and Sikorsky S-92, and above smaller ones like the Bell 412 and Eurocopter EC155. Rotor & Wing has described the AW139's flying attitude as 'docile and predictable'.

The AW139 is powered by two FADEC-controlled Pratt & Whitney Canada PT6C turboshaft engines; the FADEC system seamlessly adjusts the engines for pilot convenience and passenger comfort, and can automatically handle a single-engine failure without noticeable deviation. It was constructed with maintenance requirements in mind; critical systems can be readily accessed, where possible the number of parts has been reduced, and many components have been designed for an extended lifecycle; a Health and Usage Monitoring System (HUMS) is also equipped. More than a thousand customizable items of equipment can be configured per customer demand, including auxiliary fuel tanks, rescue hoists, cargo hooks, search and weather radar, ice protection systems, external cameras and searchlights, and seating arrangements.

The AW139 cockpit is based on the modular Honeywell Primus EPIC avionics system incorporating a four LCD screen glass cockpit. Although an option on early models, most aircraft include a four-axis autopilot, which allows higher levels of automation and safety and enables advanced functions such as auto-hover. This level of automation has allowed certification for single-pilot operations under instrument flight rules conditions (SPIFR), and the cockpit can also optionally be modified for compatibility with night vision goggles. The latest version of the Primus EPIC avionics systems includes a Synthetic Vision System. Pilot training for the type is available via advanced Level D Full Flight Simulators. According to Shipping & Marine, the AW139 has "the largest cabin in its class"; containing up to 15 passengers or four litters and accompanying medics, an additional baggage compartment is used to stow equipment to keep the main cabin clear for use.

Large sections of the AW139 have been developed and produced by a range of different companies. Airframes are typically produced by PZL-Świdnik, who delivered their 200th airframe in April 2014. Pratt & Whitney Canada produce the type's PT6C turboshaft engines, while the primary and secondary transmissions were developed by Westland GKN and Kawasaki Heavy Industries respectively. A significant portion of the avionics are sourced from Honeywell. Turkish Aerospace Industries has been subcontracted to manufacture various elements of the AW139, including the fuselage, canopy, and radome. Final assembly of most AW139s is performed at AgustaWestland's facilities in Philadelphia, United States, and Vergiate, Italy; those destined for customers within the Commonwealth of Independent States are typically assembled by a third final manufacturing plant in Tomilino, Moscow operated by HeliVert.

Operational history

The Irish Air Corps was the first military operator to introduce the AW139; it took delivery of the first of a batch of six rotorcraft during August 2006. The United Arab Emirates Air Force and the Qatar Air Force became the second and third military operators of the AW139, procuring 9 and 18 rotorcraft respectively. A specialised military variant, the AW139M, was subsequently launched, for which the Italian Air Force became the launch customer. Designated HH-139A in Italian service, the type has been primarily tasked with combat search and rescue (CSAR) operations. The Italian Coast Guard also placed repeat orders for the type throughout the 2010s, having reportedly ordered a total of 12 AW139s by mid-2016.

During February 2006, Mitsui Bussan Aerospace signed a $100 million contract for 12 AW139s and an exclusive distribution agreement for the AW139 in Japan. In October 2006, the Japan Coast Guard announced its selection of the AW139 as the replacement for its Bell 212 search and rescue fleet; by early 2011, 18 AW139s were on order by the Japan Coast Guard through Mitsui Bussan as the distributor, a total of 24 are expected to be ordered."AgustaWestland receives orders for 8 more AW139 helicopters." Shephard Media, 9 March 2011. The Japanese National Police Agency placed multiple orders for the AW139; other organisations in the nation have used the type for electronic news gathering, firefighting, disaster relief operations. During 2016, Leonardo announced that the 50th AW139 to the Japanese market had been delivered. In March 2017, the delivery of the first Japanese VIP-configured AW139 took place to an undisclosed customer.

In the North American market, CHC Helicopter was the first operator of the type. In 2012, CHC became the largest operator of the AW139 in the world, at that point operating a fleet of 44 in search and rescue, emergency medical service and offshore transport missions. In 2015, responsibility for the maintenance of CHC's AW139 fleet was reorganized under their maintenance, repair and overhaul services (MRO) division, Heli-One; early activities have included post-delivery modifications and engine overhauls. Heli-One has endeavoured to expand the scope of its MRO in coordination with Leonardo Helicopters, becoming an authorized component repair center by the company, and become approved to perform main gearbox work in April 2021.

During October 2012, the Royal Thai Army ordered a pair of AW139s; a further eight were produced in October 2015. In September 2021, the privately-owned company Thai Aviation Services arranged the delivery of three AW139s to undertake a multi-year contract to support oil and gas extraction activities in Malaysia. In 2021, following the retirement of the Royal Malaysian Air Force's Sikorsky S-61 fleet, the service leased four AW139s as an interim replacement.

Qatar-based firm Gulf Helicopters has become one of the largest AW139 operators worldwide, first ordering the type in 2007 for offshore transport duties; it has since become an authorized service center and training center for the AW139. Malaysian operator Weststar Aviation has the distinction of being the biggest operator of the AW139 in the Asia Pacific region; by February 2014, the company hah ordered a total of 34 helicopters. Since taking delivery of their first AW139 in December 2010, Weststar has typically employed the type in support of offshore oil and gas operations.

Numerous AW139s have been produced for operators in Russia, mainly via the HeliVert initiative. In September 2014, Exclases Russia ordered three in VIP configurations. During December 2021, it was announced that HeliVert had supplied four AW139s to the Russian state-owned defense conglomerate Rostec. In March 2022, shortly following the Russian invasion of Ukraine, Leonardo Helicopters suspended its business in Russia and restricted the support available to existing operators of the type in the country.

In July 2014, AgustaWestland announce that the global fleet had accumulated in excess of one million flight hours; by this milestone, a total of 770 AW139s had been produced.

On 24 May 2016, AugustaWestland parent Leonardo-Finmeccanica announced that Pakistan had signed a contract for an undisclosed number of AW139s as part of a fleet renewal programme spread over several batches, including a logistic support and training package, to perform search and rescue (SAR) operations across the country. At the time of the announcement, a total of 11 AW139s were already in service in Pakistan, five of which were being operated for government relief and general transportation duties.

Chinese operators have also imported the type. By February 2010, two AW139s had been ordered by both the Beijing Municipal Public Security Bureau and the Shenzhen Public Security Bureau for law enforcement, disaster relief, and general transportation duties. In July 2022, it was stated that 40 AW139s had been delivered by Leonardo Helicopters to the country while the largest civil helicopter operator in China, CITIC Offshore Helicopter, operates eight AW139s alone.

On 24 September 2018, the United States Air Force (USAF) announced that the MH-139, an AW139 variant, was the winner of a competition to replace the Vietnam-era Bell UH-1Ns, accordingly, the service is set to buy up to 84 MH-139s. On 19 December 2019, the USAF received the first MH-139A Grey Wolf at Eglin Air Force Base. Flight testing by the service commenced during 2020.

Variants
AB139
Original Italian-built production aircraft, 54 built.
AW139
Designation change from 55th aircraft onwards, built in Italy.
AW139 (long nose configuration)
Long nose variant with increased room for avionics built in Italy and the United States.
AW139M
Militarised variant, capable of carrying various weapons payloads.
HH-139A
Italian Air Force designation for ten search-and rescue configured AW139Ms.
VH-139A
Italian Air Force designation for two VIP configured AW139s.
HH-139B
Italian Air Force designation for newer AW139.
UH-139C
Italian State Police designation.
UH-139D
Italian Carabinieri designation.
PH-139D
Italian Guardia di Finanza designation.
US139
Military variant, was the AgustaWestland proposed entry for the US Army Light Utility Helicopter programme in partnership with L-3 Communications.
MH-139 Grey Wolf
Military variant from Boeing in partnership with Leonardo. It was selected by the United States Air Force to replace its UH-1N fleet. The USAF accepted its first MH-139 on 19 December 2019 and named it "Grey Wolf".
AW139W
A variant offered to the Polish Armed Forces.

Operators
The AW139 is used by military and civilian operators.

Military

Algerian Air Force
Algerian Navy

 National Air Force of Angola

Australian Army
Royal Australian Air Force (contracted with CHC Helicopter)

Bangladesh Air Force

Colombian Air Force (VVIP Presidential helicopter) 

Cyprus Air Force

Egyptian Air Force

Ivory Coast Air Force

 Irish Air Corps

 Italian Air Force
 Guardia Costiera

 Kenya Air Force

 Lebanese Air Force

 Libyan Air Force

Maltese Air Wing

Royal Malaysian Navy
Royal Malaysian Air Force

Nepalese Army Air Service

Nigerian Air Force
Nigerian Navy

Pakistan Air Force
Pakistan Army

 National Air of Panama

 Qatar Emiri Air Force

 Senegalese Air Force

 Royal Thai Army

 Trinidad & Tobago Air Guard

 Turkmen Air Force

 UAE Air Force

 United States Air Force
96th Test Wing
413th Flight Test Squadron, Eglin Air Force Base
582nd Helicopter Group
37th Helicopter Squadron, Francis E. Warren Air Force Base (planned)
40th Helicopter Squadron, Malmstrom Air Force Base (planned)
54th Helicopter Squadron, Minot Air Force Base (planned)
11th Wing
1st Helicopter Squadron, Andrews Air Force Base (planned)
908th Wing
357th Helicopter Squadron, Maxwell Air Force Base (planned)

Civilian

 Abu Dhabi Police

 Algerian Civil Defence

 Ambulance Victoria
 Queensland Government Air (QGAir)
 Toll Ambulance Rescue
 Victoria Police
 Westpac Northern Region Helicopter Rescue Service

 Brazilian Federal Police

 Bulgarian Border Police

 Ornge, 10 (12 ordered with 2 sold 2013)

 Carabineros de Chile

 Ministry of Public Security

 Croatian Border Police

 Cyprus Police Aviation Unit

 Police and Border Guard Board

 Atlantic Airways

 National Search and Rescue Agency

 Polizia di Stato
 Guardia di Finanza
 National Fire Service

 Tokyo Police Department (4 on order)
 Tokyo Fire Department
 Japan Coast Guard

 Kenya Police

 Lebanese government

 Malaysian Fire and Rescue Department
 Malaysian Maritime Enforcement Agency
 Royal Malaysia Police

 Ministry of Social Welfare, Relief and Resettlement

 Dutch Caribbean Coast Guard
 National Police

 Royal Oman Police

 Spanish Maritime Safety Agency

 Maritime Rescue Group

 His Majesty's Coastguard

 Los Angeles City Fire Department
 Maryland State Police
 Miami-Dade Fire Department
 New Jersey State Police
 U.S. Customs and Border Protection

Notable accidents
 On 19 August 2011, a Petrobras operated AW139 crashed in the sea at the Campos Basin in Brazil after taking off from an offshore oil platform, killing all four people on board.
 On 13 March 2014, Haughey Air AW139 (registration G-LBAL) crashed shortly after takeoff from Gillingham, Norfolk, United Kingdom, killing all four people on board.
 On 29 December 2018, a United Arab Emirates emergency medical services AgustaWestland AW139 on a mission to lift an injured person clipped the world's longest zip line and crashed in Jebel Jais, Ras Al Khaimah, United Arab Emirates, killing all four crew members.
 On 2 February 2019, an AW139 operated by Caverton Helicopters carrying Nigeria's Vice president Yemi Osinbajo crash-landed in Kabba, Kogi State. Though there were no casualties, the closeness of the crash to the 2019 presidential election fueled speculation of possible foul play, but Caverton attributed the crash to bad weather.
 On 4 July 2019, seven people died when AW139 N32CC crashed off of a small Bahamian island at 2 am. The helicopter was found underwater hours later, about a mile offshore. A billionaire coal baron from Beckley, West Virginia, Chris Cline, his daughter Kameron and five others were onboard headed to Florida due to a medical emergency involving one of the passengers.
 On 1 February 2020, a Fukushima prefectural police AW139 helicopter crashed in a rice field in the city of Koriyama, in northeast Japan. Seven of the crew were hurt, including three police officers, two technicians, and two medical workers. The helicopter was carrying a heart for transplant surgery to the University of Tokyo Hospital. The transplant operation was cancelled due to heart being unable to be recovered in time for a successful transplant. The Fukushima meteorological office issued a strong winds warning to Koriyama at the time of the accident. On impact, the tail and main rotor blades snapped off. The investigation is ongoing.

 Specifications (AW139) 

See also

References

Citations

Bibliography

 Gajetti, Marco and Paolo Maggiore. "Route Profitability for Helicopters." Società Editrice Esculapio, 2013. .
 Hoyle, Craig. "World Air Forces Directory". Flight International, Vol. 182, No. 5370, 11–17 December 2012. pp. 40–64. .
 Jackson, Paul. Jane's All The World's Aircraft 2003–2004. Coulsdon, UK: Jane's Defence Data, 2003. .
 Niccoli, Riccardo. "The Bell Agusta AB 139". Air International'', September 2001, Vol 61 No 3. . pp. 158–163.

External links

 
 MH-139A Grey Wolf on Boeing website
 European Aviation Safety Agency Type Certificate Data Sheet
 Federal Aviation Authority Type Certificate Data Sheet

2000s international civil utility aircraft
2000s Italian helicopters
Agusta aircraft
Twin-turbine helicopters
Aircraft first flown in 2001